The B-Line Trail is a 3.1 mile multi-use trail in the United States, connecting the downtown area of Bloomington, Indiana, to an outlying neighborhood. The trail connects with the Bloomington Rail Trail which in turn runs into the planned Limestone Greeneay trail. Four plazas are located along the trail, which is fitted with LED lighting. Works of public art including murals and sculpture are located along the trail. There are also fitness stations.

The trail runs along a former CSX Railroad bed. It was part of a rail line for more than a century. Pollution from heavy metals and hydrocarbons has been an issue at some parts because of historic cinder and coal ash emissions. The Environmental Protection Agency awarded money for environmental remediation and cleanup along the trail.

The trail's route includes Switchyard Park. The trail is used by some commuters who bicycle to workplaces such as Indiana University.

References 

Bloomington, Indiana
Hiking trails in Indiana
National Recreation Trails in Indiana